Radha Kalyanam may refer to:

 Radha Kalyanam (1981 film), a Telugu drama film
 Radha Kalyanam (1935 film), a Tamil-language film